Joonas Sildre (born 24 January 1980 in Tallinn) is an Estonian comic artist, illustrator, and graphic designer.

He graduated from Estonian Academy of Arts in graphic design.

In total, he has illustrated about 30 children's books. In 2018 he published the graphic novel "Kahe heli vahel" ('Between Two Sounds') which talks about composer Arvo Pärt.

He is the co-founder of the Estonian Comics Society (established in 2013).

References

1980 births
Living people
Estonian comics artists
Estonian cartoonists
Estonian illustrators
Estonian designers
Estonian Academy of Arts alumni
People from Tallinn